The QF 6 pounder Nordenfelt was a light 57 mm naval gun and coast defence gun of the late 19th century used by many countries.

Note that this gun should not be confused with the short-barreled 57 mm Cockerill-Nordenfelt "Canon de caponnière" or fortification gun, which was used to arm the German A7V tank in World War I.

Nordenfelt guns can be visually differentiated from equivalent and similar Hotchkiss guns by having slimmer barrels than the Hotchkiss, hence the Nordenfelt was considerably lighter.

United Kingdom
The UK adopted a 42-calibre version as Ordnance QF 6-pounder Nordenfelt  Mk I, Mk II, Mk III.

United Kingdom Naval service

They were originally mounted from 1885 onwards for use against the new (steam-driven) torpedo boats which started to enter service in the late 1870s. The Nordenfelt gun was adopted at the same time as the very similar QF 6 pounder Hotchkiss, but the Navy was not satisfied with the special Nordenfelt ammunition and fuzes. Following the explosion in 1900 of an ammunition ship due to defective fuses, Britain replaced Nordenfelt fuzes with the Hotchkiss design. Nordenfelt guns were phased out in favour of the Hotchkiss and were declared obsolete by 1919.

Finland
When Finland gained its independence from Russia in 1917 dozens of QF 6-pounder Nordenfelt cannons were stationed in Finland. After the Finnish Civil War in 1918 around 35 - 40 Nordenfelt cannons became available to the Finnish army. These guns were later used as a standard light coastal gun of the Finnish coastal artillery and were in service until the 1950s. During World War II some of these guns were also used as fortification artillery and bunker guns in the Mannerheim Line.

Ammunition
Diagrams showing the proprietary Nordenfelt 1-inch (top left) and 6-pounder (all others, labelled "2.2 inch") ammunition designs :

Surviving examples
A gun at Royal Queensland Yacht Squadron, Manly, Queensland, Australia
A gun at the Manege Military Museum, Helsinki, Finland

See also
List of naval guns

Weapons of comparable role, performance and era
QF 6-pounder Hotchkiss: Hotchkiss equivalent

Notes

References

Bibliography
Text Book of Gunnery, 1902. LONDON : PRINTED FOR HIS MAJESTY'S STATIONERY OFFICE, BY HARRISON AND SONS, ST. MARTIN'S LANE 
I.V. Hogg and L.F. Thurston, British Artillery Weapons & Ammunition 1914-1918. London: Ian Allan, 1972.

External links

 Handbook for the Nordenfelt 6-PR quick firing guns Marks I and II. Great Britain. Admiralty. London : Printed for Her Majesty's Stationery Office by Eyre & Spottiswoode 1887 at State Library of Victoria
 Handbook of the 6 pounder Nordenfelt quick-firing gun. Land service 1892, 1900 at State Library of Victoria
 Handbook of the Nordenfelt 6-pr. quick-firing guns, marks I and II, 1897 at State Library of Victoria
 Victorian Naval Forces manuals 1890 & 1895. Includes QF 6 pounder Nordenfelt details. From Friends of the Cerberus website
Nordenfelt 6 pdr Quick Firer History, technical details, animations
 Animation showing the mechanism of the Nordenfelt 6 pdr

Victorian-era weapons of the United Kingdom
57 mm artillery
Naval guns of the United Kingdom
Coastal artillery